Channel 31 refers to several television stations:

Australia
The colloquial name for certain community television stations in Australia
 Access 31
 Hitchhike TV, formerly 31 Digital
 C31 Melbourne
 Channel 31 (Sydney)
 Channel 44 (Adelaide), formerly known as Channel 31

Canada
The following television stations broadcast on digital channel 31 (UHF frequencies covering 573.25-577.75 MHz) in Canada:
 CBAT-DT in Fredericton, New Brunswick
 CHAU-DT-2 in Saint-Quentin, New Brunswick
 CITY-DT-2 in Woodstock, Ontario
 CIVB-DT-1 in Grand-Fonds, Quebec

The following television stations operate on virtual channel 31 in Canada:
 CITY-DT-2 in Woodstock, Ontario
 CIVB-DT-1 in Grand-Fonds, Quebec

United States
 Channel 31 digital TV stations in the United States
 Channel 31 virtual TV stations in the United States
 Channel 31 low-power TV stations in the United States

Other places
 Channel 31 (Kazakhstan), a nationwide television station in Kazakhstan
 BEAM Channel 31 in the Philippines
 RTHK TV 31 in Hong Kong
 Channel 31 TV stations in Mexico

See also
 31 (disambiguation)

31